The Thaddeus Kosciusko Bridge, commonly referred to as the Twin Bridges, or just "The Twins", located in the United States, is a pair of identical through arch bridges, made of steel, which span the Mohawk River between the towns of Colonie, Albany County and Halfmoon, Saratoga County, in New York's Capital District. One span carries three lanes of Interstate 87 northbound and one carries three southbound lanes between exits 7 and 8. The toll-free bridge opened in 1959 as part of the Adirondack Northway, a  highway linking Albany and the Canada–United States border at Champlain.  The Interstate 87 section of the highway was formally inaugurated by Governor Nelson Rockefeller on May 26, 1961.

The bridge is named (using an anglicized form) in honor of Tadeusz Kościuszko (1746–1817), the preeminent national figure in Poland's fight for independence.  Kościuszko arrived in Colonial America a month after the July 4, 1776 Declaration of Independence and remained a notable military leader throughout the Revolutionary War, attaining the rank of general as well as honorary American citizenship. He returned to Poland in July 1784.

The decks on both sides of the bridge were replaced in the spring of 2013.

See also
 
 
 
 Kosciuszko Bridge

References

External links
 
Thaddeus Kosciusko Northway Bridge at Bridges & Tunnels
Thaddeus Kosciusko Bridge at Capital Highways
 

Through arch bridges in the United States
Bridges completed in 1959
Transportation in Capital District (New York)
Road bridges in New York (state)
Interstate 87 (New York)
Bridges on the Interstate Highway System
Steel bridges in the United States
Bridges in Albany County, New York
Bridges in Saratoga County, New York